Vitex ajugaeflora is a species of plant in the family Lamiaceae. It is endemic to Vietnam.

References

ajugaeflora
Endemic flora of Vietnam
Vulnerable plants
Taxonomy articles created by Polbot